Edith Fitzgerald (1889-1968) was an American screenwriter and playwright active primarily during the 1930s.

Biography 
Born and raised in Burnside, Kentucky, Edith Pearl Fitzgerald was one of 12 children born to John Fitzgerald and Dora Roberts.

During the course of her career, she co-wrote several Broadway plays with Robert Riskin, her then-boyfriend, including Her Delicate Condition. The two parted ways after they moved to the West Coast, and they never married despite press reports to the contrary.

She was married to Elmer Griffin, a star tennis player, and she became a tennis champion in her own right. She died in 1968 in Charlotte, North Carolina, after a brief illness.

Partial filmography 

 Within the Law (1939)
 My American Wife (1936)
 Small Town Girl (1936)
 The Wedding Night (1935)
 The Painted Veil (1934)
 Brief Moment (1933) (adaptation)
 Today We Live (1933)
 Many a Slip (1931)
 Illicit (1931)
 Ex-Lady (1933)

References 

1889 births
1968 deaths
People from Pulaski County, Kentucky
Screenwriters from Kentucky
American women screenwriters
20th-century American dramatists and playwrights
American women dramatists and playwrights
20th-century American women writers
20th-century American screenwriters